Frany María Fong Echavarría (born 28 August 1992 in Los Mochis, Sinaloa) is a Mexican track cyclist. She represented her nation at the 2014 and 2015 UCI Track Cycling World Championships.

References

External links
 profile at Cyclingarchives.com

1992 births
Living people
Mexican female cyclists
Sportspeople from Los Mochis
Cyclists at the 2015 Pan American Games
Pan American Games competitors for Mexico
21st-century Mexican women
20th-century Mexican women
Competitors at the 2014 Central American and Caribbean Games